The Czech Lodge at Spodnje Ravni is a mountain hostel that stands on the Spodnje Ravni Cirque above the Ravne Combe below the northern part of Mount Grintovec and the Long Ridge. It is named after the Czechs from Prague who built it in 1900. In the 1970s, it was renovated, but the Czech architectural style remained. It is managed by the Jezersko Mountaineering Club. Its groundskeeper was for 40 years Andrej Karničar, then for 10 ten years Tone Karničar, and since July 2015 Karmen Karničar.

Starting points 
 2 h: from Zgornje Jezersko Spodnji kraj
 2.30 h: from Zgornje Jezersko Zgornji kraj lower cargo cable station
 2.30 h: from Zgornje Jezersko Zgornji kraj), passing the Štular Pasture

Neighbouring lodges 
 4.30 h: to the Zois Lodge at Kokra Saddle (1793 m), via Dolci Notch Pass 
 4 h: to the Zois Lodge at Kokra Saddle (1793 m), via the Mlinar Saddle
 1 h: to the Kranj Lodge at Ledine (1700 m)

Neighbouring mountains 
 3.30 h: Grintovec (2558 m), via the Mlinar Saddle
 4 h: Grintovec (2558 m), via the Dolci Notch Pass
 3.30 h: Kočna (2540 m), via the Kremžar Route
 3.30 h: Skuta (2532 m), via the Long Ridge
 4 h: Skuta (2532 m), via the Long Ridge

See also 
 Slovenian Mountain Hiking Trail

References 
 Slovenska planinska pot, Planinski vodnik, PZS, 2012, Milenko Arnejšek - Prle, Andraž Poljanec

Zunanje povezave 
 Photos, Routes & Descriptions
  on www.pzs.si

Mountain huts in Slovenia
Kamnik–Savinja Alps
Buildings and structures completed in 1900
20th-century architecture in Slovenia